Leeds Pond is a natural pond in Plandome Manor, in Nassau County, on Long Island, in New York, United States.

Description 
Leeds Pond is located in Plandome Manor, New York.

Leeds Pond Preserve 
Nassau County's 35-acre (14 ha) Leeds Pond Preserve is located adjacent to Leeds Pond. It contains wooded areas and the Science Museum of Long Island.

Leeds Pond Sub-Watershed 
The Leeds Pond Sub-Watershed is a sub-watershed of Manhasset Bay. The storm water which flows into Leeds Pond then has an overflow discharge into Manhasset Bay. Much of the area within watershed's boundaries is developed, and most stormwater in the watershed therefore enters the pond via. storm drains. 

Communities either partially or wholly within the Leeds Pond Sub-Watershed include:

 Flower Hill
 Manhasset (including potions of Strathmore)
 Munsey Park
 Plandome
 Plandome Heights
 Plandome Manor
 Port Washington
 Roslyn Estates

References 

Manhasset, New York